Hysteropterum is a genus of planthoppers described by Amyot & Serville in 1843, belonging to the family Issidae, subfamily Issinae.

Distribution 
Species of this genus occur in Europe and North Africa; the numerous New World species formerly assigned to this group have been reassigned to separate genera (e.g., Kathleenum).

Description 
The adult planthoppers reach  of length, the basic coloration of their body is mostly pale brown or yellowish, with well drawn veins on wings. The females are usually bigger than the males.

Species 

 Hysteropterum albaceticum Dlabola, 1983
 Hysteropterum algiricum (Lucas, 1849)
 Hysteropterum alicantium Dlabola, 1986
 Hysteropterum bolearicum Dlabola, 1982
 Hysteropterum curviceps Synave, 1956
 Hysteropterum dolichotum Gnezdilov & Mazzoni, 2004
 Hysteropterum melanophles Fieber, 1877
 Hysteropterum reticulatum (Herrich-Schäffer, 1835)
 Hysteropterum subangulare Rey, 1891
 Hysteropterum tkalcui (Dlabola, 1980)
 Hysteropterum vasconicum Gnezdilov, 2003

References 

Hysteropterinae
Insects of North Africa
Hemiptera of Europe
Auchenorrhyncha genera